Steven or Stephen Beck may refer to:

Real people
Stephen Beck, American artist, writer, toy designer and inventor
Steven Beck, musician in Tickle Me Pink

Fictional characters
Steven Beck, character in Z Nation
Steven Beck, character in Witness Protection (film)
Steven Beck, character in Leviathan (1989 film)

See also
Steve Beck (disambiguation)